Acanthanectes rufus is a species of triplefin blenny. It was described by Holleman and Buxton, in 1993. It has been recorded from Tsitsikamma National Park to Cape Recife in South Africa.

References

rufus
Fish described in 1993